George Pennant may refer to:

George Douglas Pennant
George Dawkins Pennant